Tora Arhizoun Ta Dyskola (Greek: Τώρα Αρχίζουν Τα Δύσκολα; English: Now The Difficult Times Begin) is the fifth studio album by Greek singer Sakis Rouvas, released on 12 May 1996 in Greece and Cyprus by PolyGram Records Greece.  This was Rouvas' second album to be entirely produced by singer-songwriter, composer and multi-instrumentalist Nikos Karvelas, after the groundbreaking success of Aima, Dakrya & Idrotas in 1994.

Track listing

Special Edition
It was re-released by PolyGram Greece to contain four bonus tracks of remixes of the previous hit singles from the album.

Track listing

Music videos
"Tora Arhizoun Ta Dyskola" (Director: Vangelis Kalaïdjis; Writer: Elias Psinakis)
"Afiste Tin" (Director: TRAFFIC)
"Pou ke Pote" (Director: Art Management)

References

External links
Sakis Rouvas' official website
IFPI Greece official website with Greek charts

1996 albums
Albums produced by Nikos Karvelas
Greek-language albums
Sakis Rouvas albums
Universal Music Greece albums